Michael K. Clifford is an American education investor and consultant, and a proponent of education.

Early life
Initially following his father's trade as a musician, Clifford converted to Christianity and decided to follow Jesus in his mid-twenties. Contacts made through faith-based non-profit organizations introduced him to John Sperling and Brian Mueller, and he moved into the field of online higher education. Working as a fundraiser for faith-based organizations brought Clifford to the notice of Pat Robertson, and he co-managed Robertson's 1988 bid for the U.S. presidency.

Career
Michael K. Clifford's early business practices involved identifying and purchasing nonprofit colleges and converting them to for-profit institutions. He was also involved in the creation of the Jack Welch Management Institute.

From 1999 to 2005, Michael Clifford was the President of TeleUniversity, the progenitor of The University of Arizona Global Campus.

In 2004 Clifford bought Grand Canyon University on behalf of Dream Center Education Holdings.

In 2007 Clifford co-founded American Way Education the owner of Los Angeles College International. In 2012, the college closed.

In 2008, a Clifford entity paid $5.25 million to buy a Cleveland, Ohio college, Myers University, out of bankruptcy and Clifford renamed it Chancellor University. During his tenure, at a full faculty and staff meeting, Clifford lauded the teaching of business courses and flat-out insulted liberal arts professors and their classes. A former university administrator said that he viewed the school's leadership as "callous, anti-intellectual, insensitive ego-freaks." He added that "their quest for the Holy Grail of an on-line money fountain was ill-advised and obviously unsuccessful."

Clifford bought a bible college in Memphis in 2009, named it Victory University, and installed former Arkansas governor Mike Huckabee as chancellor. That school closed in 2014. 

In 2010, Clifford was profiled in the PBS documentary College Inc., which examined the effects of and failures surrounding the for-profit college industry.

In 2013, Clifford created DreamDegree, an unaccredited online learning portal. He founded Significant Systems, a consultancy firm for higher education institutions, which later rebranded as SignificantFederation.

In 2017, Clifford was a key player in the creation of Dream Center Education Holdings, LLC., a subsidiary of Dream Center Foundation. Dream Center Education Holdings, LLC. purchased the failing assets of Education Management Corporation (EDMC) which includes Art Institutes, Argosy University, and South University in the hopes to convert them into non-profit institutions in order to avoid for-profit oversight.

See also
Dream Center
Grand Canyon University
Jack Welch Management Institute
Victory University

References

External links

American investors
Living people
Year of birth missing (living people)